West Indies women's cricket team toured Australia from 21 October 2014 to 18 November 2014. The tour included a series of four Twenty20 Internationals and four One Day Internationals. The first three ODI matches were a part of the 2014–16 ICC Women's Championship. West Indian women also played two T20 matches against Cricket Australia Women's XI.

Squads

Tour matches

1st T20

2nd T20

T20I series

1st T20I

2nd T20I

3rd T20I

4th T20I

ODI series

1st ODI

2nd ODI

3rd ODI

4th ODI

References 

Women's international cricket tours of Australia
2014–16 ICC Women's Championship
West Indian cricket tours of Australia
Australia 2014
2014–15 Australian women's cricket season
2014 in West Indian cricket
2014 in women's cricket